Koromiko may refer to:
 Veronica salicifolia, a plant endemic to New Zealand
 Veronica stricta, a plant endemic to New Zealand
 Koromiko, New Zealand, a locality in Marlborough, New Zealand